This is a list of current and former Roman Catholic churches in the Roman Catholic Diocese of Trenton. The diocese covers the counties of Burlington, Mercer, Monmouth, and Ocean in central New Jersey.

Trenton

Other areas

References

 
Trenton